Kupu is a former text editor for web browsers.

Kupu may also refer to:

KUPU (TV), a television station in Honolulu, Hawaii
Kupu, Estonia, a village